This is a list of closed railway stations in Ireland. Year of passenger closure is given if known.  Stations reopened as Heritage railways or Luas stops continue to be included in this list and some have been linked. Some stations have been reopened to passenger traffic. Some lines are still in use for freight and mineral traffic.

Table of stations

Notes and references

External links 

 
Clo